Starzyce  is a village in the administrative district of Gmina Chociwel, within Stargard County, West Pomeranian Voivodeship, in north-western Poland.

The village has a population of 352.

Before 1945/1990 the area was part of Germany. For the history of the region, see History of Pomerania.

References

Starzyce